Bice is a mineral pigment or a rarely used plural of bus. Other uses include:

Acronym
BICE, the U.S. Bureau of Immigration and Customs Enforcement
 BICE, the International Catholic Child Bureau

People with the surname
Bo Bice (born 1975), the singer and musician
Sir John George Bice (1853–1923), South Australian politician
Jack Bice (1884–1967), his son, also a politician
Mark Bice (born 1984), Canadian curling player
Olivette Bice (born 1968), Vanuatuan sprinter
Robert Bice (1914–1968), American actor
Steve Bice (born 1981), Canadian curler
Stephanie Bice (born 1973), American politician

Given name
Beatrice (given name)

Literature
Beatrice Portinari, the woman known as Bice featured in the poems of Dante Alighieri